Brandon Zerk-Thatcher (born 25 August 1998) is an Australian rules footballer who plays for the Essendon Football Club in the Australian Football League (AFL). He was selected with pick 66 in the 2018 national draft. He made his senior debut against Fremantle in round 22 of the 2019 season.

Early life
Zerk-Thatcher was educated at Murray Bridge High School. At the age of 18 he started playing for Sturt Football Club and competed in the NAB AFL Under 18 Championships for South Australia.

References

External links

Brandon Zerk-Thatcher from AFL Tables

Essendon Football Club players
Sturt Football Club players
Australian rules footballers from South Australia
1998 births
Living people